Columbia River High School is a public high school in Vancouver, Washington, United States. It is part of the Vancouver Public Schools system and opened in 1962. Columbia River has over 1,200 students. Columbia River is a magnet school in the VSD for the International Baccalaureate Program.

Demographics
As of 1 October 2006, 1317 students attend Columbia River High School. Of all students enrolled, 1183, or 85 percent identify themselves as White; 80, or 6 percent identify themselves as Asian; 56, or 4 percent identify themselves as Hispanic; 31, or 2 percent identify themselves as Black; and 15, or 1 percent identify themselves as American Indian. Among all grade levels, 16 percent of students are eligible for federally subsidized lunch. One student is enrolled in the English Language Learning program and 132, or 9 percent of all students receive Special Education. English is the primary language spoken at home for 95 percent of students. It is followed by Spanish, Vietnamese, and Russian, which are each spoken by 1 percent of the student body. Of all students, 35 percent are enrolled on boundary exceptions.

Compared to the Vancouver School District high school populace as a whole, Columbia River students are more white, more likely to speak English at home and less likely to be eligible for subsidized lunches.

Sports

Football

Cross country
The boys' 1965 (Fall season of 1964) and 1971 (Fall season of 1970) cross country teams won the State Cross Country Championships.

Track and field
The Columbia River Girls track team won the 3A state championship in 2010.

Baseball
Columbia River won the 1984 and 1989 Washington State 3A championship.

Fastpitch Softball
Columbia River won the 1992 and went back-to-back in the 1996 and 1997 Washington State 4A championships.

Wrestling
Columbia River won the 1969 and 1986 Washington State 3A championship.

Volleyball
Columbia River won the 1991 4A and 2000 3A Washington State championship.

Gymnastics
Columbia River won the 2009 Girls 3A Washington State championships.

Soccer
The Chieftains won the girls 3A soccer state championship in 2010 and 2013, and the 2A soccer state championship in 2017 and 2019.

Bowling
Columbia River won the girl's 3A bowling state championship 2015.

Tennis
The Columbia River girls team won the 2019 Washington 2A State championship.

Capturing Solar Energy
Solar panels were installed at Columbia River High School on May 26, 2010. The panels were purchased by a grant through the Clark Public Utilities Green Lights Program. Under peak sun conditions, the panels will produce 2,160 watts of power. Under typical Vancouver conditions, this relates to 2,400 kilowatt hours per year.

Notable alumni
 Bruce Barnum - football head coach, Portland State University
Roscoe Divine - 1965 alumnus, elite track and field runner, competed for University of Oregon
 Dan Frantz - 1996 alumnus, placekicker for Chicago Rush (AFL)
 Roger Hambright, former MLB player (New York Yankees)
 Denny Heck - 1970 alumnus, Lt. Governor of State of Washington (2021-).  Congressman from WA 10th District (2013-2020) and founder of TVW
 Ed Herman - professional Mixed Martial Artist, currently competing in the UFC
 Yuh-Line Niou - New York assemblymember (2016-present)
 Joe Phillips - NFL defensive lineman
 Brett Pierce - NFL tight end
 Stan Spencer - former Major League Baseball pitcher (San Diego Padres)

References

External links

Educational institutions established in 1964
High schools in Vancouver, Washington
Public high schools in Washington (state)
Magnet schools in Washington (state)
1964 establishments in Washington (state)